Zetterlund is a surname. Notable people with the surname include:

Fabian Zetterlund (born 1999), Swedish ice hockey player
Lars Zetterlund (born 1964), Swedish footballer
Monica Zetterlund (1937–2005), Swedish singer and actress
Rolf Zetterlund (born 1942), Swedish footballer and manager
Yoko Zetterlund (born 1969), Japanese volleyball player